Hidroaviación was a Peruvian football club that was located in the city of Ancón, Lima. The club was founded with the name of club Hidroaviación and played in Primera Division Peruana from 1929 until 1931. The club was third place of the national tournament in 1929. In 1931, Hidroaviación was relegated and it was their last appearance in the Primera Division Peruana since.

Achievements
Primera División Peruana:
 Third Place (1): 1929

See also
List of football clubs in Peru
Peruvian football league system

External links
 RSSSF - Peru - List of Champions
 Peruvian football seasons - 1929, 1930, 1931

Football clubs in Lima